The Fred Graham House is a historic house on United States Route 62 in Hardy, Arkansas.  It is a vernacular Tudor Revival structure,  stories in height, built out of uncoursed native fieldstone finished with beaded mortar.  The roof is side gabled, with two front-facing cross gables.  The south-facing front facade has a stone chimney with brick trim positioned just west of center between the cross gables, and a raised porch to the west of that.  Built c. 1931, it is a fine local example of vernacular Tudor Revival architecture.

The house was listed on the National Register of Historic Places in 1999.

See also
National Register of Historic Places listings in Sharp County, Arkansas

References

Houses on the National Register of Historic Places in Arkansas
Tudor Revival architecture in Arkansas
Houses completed in 1931
Houses in Sharp County, Arkansas
National Register of Historic Places in Sharp County, Arkansas